Peter Potts (29 June 1935 – 30 January 1996) was a British trade unionist, who served as General Secretary of the General Federation of Trade Unions.

Potts grew up in Manchester, where he attended Chorlton High School.  He began working and joined the Union of Shop, Distributive and Allied Workers in 1951.  After undertaking National Service with the Royal Air Force from 1953 to 1955, he became increasingly involved in trade unionism, and in 1965 became the full-time research officer of the National Union of Tailors and Garment Workers (NUTGW).  He also spent time studying at Ruskin College.

In 1974, Potts becoming NUTGW's national officer for clerical and supervisory staffs, and from 1975 he was involved in the Trade Union Research Unit, which he chaired from 1984.  He was recruited by the General Federation of Trade Unions as its general secretary, taking over at the end of 1977.  Alongside this post, he was also on the Trade Union Unit Trust Investors Committee, the governing council of Ruskin College, and from 1979, the Trade Union International Research and Education Group.  From 1987 to 1990, he additionally served on the Press Council.

Potts retired in 1994, but remained active as the chair of the Trade Union International Research and Education Group.  He died early in 1996.

References

1935 births
1996 deaths
Alumni of Ruskin College
Trade unionists from Manchester
General Secretaries of the General Federation of Trade Unions (UK)
Royal Air Force airmen
20th-century Royal Air Force personnel